Aulon was a town of ancient Greece on the island of Naxos. It is cited in an inscription dated to the 3rd century BCE.

Its site is located on Naxos.

References

Populated places in the ancient Aegean islands
Former populated places in Greece
Ancient Naxos